The 1985 Nabisco Grand Prix de Madrid was a men's tennis tournament played on outdoor clay courts in Madrid, Spain that was part of the 1985 Nabisco Grand Prix circuit. It was the 14th edition of the tournament and was played from 13 May until 19 May 1985. The tournament was downgraded from a Super Series to a Regular Series event due to the return of the Las Vegas tournament and subsequently the prize money was lowered from $200,000 to $80,000. Unseeded Andreas Maurer won the singles title.

Finals

Singles
 Andreas Maurer defeated  Lawson Duncan 7–5, 6–2
 It was Maurer's only singles title of his career.

Doubles
 Givaldo Barbosa /  Ivan Kley defeated  Jorge Bardou /  Alberto Tous 7–6, 6–4

References

External links
 ITF tournament edition details

Madrid Tennis Grand Prix
Madrid
Madrid